Summer Moak (born June 3, 1999) is an American racing cyclist, who currently rides for American amateur team LUX Development Cycling Team.

References

External links
 

1999 births
Living people
American female cyclists
Place of birth missing (living people)
21st-century American women